It's Me or the Dog is an English television program featuring dog trainer Victoria Stilwell who addresses canine behavioral problems (which are often shown putting a strain on interpersonal relationships), teaches responsible dog ownership and promotes dog training techniques based on positive reinforcement. There was also an American television version of the show which ran for four seasons. The show currently airs in about 50 countries worldwide.

Beginnings
British born Victoria Stilwell was an actor who had built her sideline interest in dog training into a full-time business when she saw the first episode of Supernanny and realised that what she was doing with dogs was similar to what Jo Frost was doing with children. She contacted the producers of Super Nanny, British reality-show producers Ricochet Television, who responded immediately, and production began on It's Me or the Dog. Stilwell said her motivation was to "highlight positive training because there are so many dominance trainers out there messing it all up". Stilwell acknowledges that training a dog on television is not the same as training without the cameras and crew.

Format

A similar concept to Supernanny-(albeit dealing with dogs instead of children), most episodes begin with a brief interview with the dog owners on when they first met their dog(s) and how their ordeals began. Victoria observes the dog(s) and owners in their home and in a range of situations, including seeing firsthand how it disrupts relationships with other people. Once there's sufficient evidence of the bad behavior, she then spends two or more days teaching the owners how to create a better atmosphere for both dog and owner, and how to train specific behaviors. On occasion owners are taken to shelters or training centers to provide them with additional information. Victoria then leaves them to implement her training regimen on their own.  After some time (usually several weeks), Victoria returns to evaluate how the dog and owner are progressing, and, when necessary, dispenses more training advice. 
This format mirrors the format of Super Nanny.

US Season 3, filmed in New York, took a looser documentary format. Stilwell sometimes implements a technique as soon as she sees a behavior rather than waiting until after the Confrontation.

Series and success
There have been three US seasons and four UK series of It's Me or the Dog so far, the first running for six episodes from 31 August 2005, and earning record ratings for Channel 4. The second series aired from January – March 2006, running for twelve episodes.  The third series transmitted from October to November 2006, and was eight episodes long, which included two-hour long specials wrapped at each end; It's Me or the Dog – The Event and It's Me or the Fat Dog. In 2007, a special one-hour show at the Crufts Competition was shown on 13 March, and a fourth series of six episodes aired in July and August.

In June 2021, it was announced on Victoria Stilwell's Facebook page and on the It's Me or the Dog YouTube channel, that a fifth series of It's Me or the Dog (UK) had been commissioned and they were looking for applicants. Victoria stated that they would be following all UK COVID-19 guidelines. The series premiered on the UK channel Really on the 10th November 2021 at 9pm and 9:30pm GMT. The series was also released for streaming on Discovery+ UK.

Victoria Stilwell has also written two accompanying books, published by HarperCollins and titled It's Me or the Dog: How to Have the Perfect Pet and Fat Dog Slim: How to Have a Healthy, Happy Pet. The first book has also been published in the US by Hyperion. Stilwell and her husband, Van Zeiler, have established a website titled Positively.com to raise awareness of the benefits of using humane training tools.

U.S. version
The show premiered on Animal Planet in the United States on 16 April 2007. In this version, the first season consists of various British families and their dogs (including the It's Me or the Fat Dog special) while the second season has American dog owners. Animal Planet's second season premiered in the fall of 2008.

In 2011, the show attempted a new direction with a New York theme which became US season three. US season 4, also filmed in New York, premiered on 2 June 2012. It included 10 episodes with one released each week.  The show attempted a new direction where it focused more on the owners and their personality traits than on their pets.  It included such episodes as 'The Castle Goes to the Dogs' with Matt Demar, a former rapper whose clubs later came under investigation for drug sales and his then-girlfriend Melissa Ballacchino, and another where a German shepherd's owner taught his dog to bite trees.

The USA version in the UK aired on Pick instead of on Channel 4.

Episodes (U.K. version)

Series 1

Series 2

Series 3

Series 4

Series 5

Transmissions

U.S. version

International broadcasts
It's Me or the Dog has aired on several networks around the world, including:

References

Notes

Further reading

External links
 (UK version)
 (US version)

2005 British television series debuts
2008 British television series endings
Animal Planet original programming
Dog training and behavior
English-language television shows
Television shows about dogs
Television series by Warner Bros. Television Studios